Euchrysops subpallida, the ashen smoky blue, is a butterfly of the family Lycaenidae. It is found in Kenya, from Tanzania to Malawi, Zambia, southern Zaire (Shaba), Zimbabwe and South Africa. In South Africa it is rare and only known from the northern part of the Limpopo province and northern KwaZulu-Natal.

The wingspan is 23–25 mm for males and 24–28 mm for females. Adults are on wing from September to February depending on rains. There is one generation per year.

The larvae probably feed on Ocimum species.

References

 
 

Butterflies described in 1923
subpallida